Gomontia is a genus of green algae, in the family Gomontiaceae.

The genus name of Gomontia is in honour of Maurice-Augustin Gomont (1839 - 1909), who was a French phycologist.

The genus was circumscribed by Jean-Baptiste Édouard Bornet and Charles Henri Marie Flahault in J. Bot. (Morot) vol.2 on page 164 in 1888.

References

External links

Ulvophyceae genera
Ulotrichales
Taxa named by Jean-Baptiste Édouard Bornet